Charles Edward Cornelius (born July 27, 1952) is a former American football defensive back who played four seasons in the National Football League with the Miami Dolphins and San Francisco 49ers. He played college football at Bethune-Cookman University and attended Delray Beach in Delray Beach, Florida. He was also a member of the Montreal Alouettes/Concordes and the Ottawa Rough Riders of the Canadian Football League.

References

External links
Just Sports Stats
Fanbase profile

Living people
1952 births
Players of American football from Florida
American football defensive backs
Canadian football defensive backs
African-American players of American football
African-American players of Canadian football
Bethune–Cookman Wildcats football players
Miami Dolphins players
San Francisco 49ers players
Montreal Alouettes players
Montreal Concordes players
Ottawa Rough Riders players
Sportspeople from Boynton Beach, Florida
21st-century African-American people
20th-century African-American sportspeople